The 2018 Challenge Cup, also known as the Ladbrokes Challenge Cup for sponsorship reasons, was the 117th staging of the Challenge Cup, the main rugby league knockout tournament for teams in the Super League, the British National Leagues and a number of invited amateur clubs.

The cup was won by Catalans Dragons, who beat Warrington Wolves 20–14 at Wembley on 25 August 2018 to become the first non-British team to win the challenge cup in its 117-year history.
The defending champions, Hull F.C., went out at the quarter-final stage.

The Catalans , Tony Gigot, was voted the winner of the Lance Todd Trophy, becoming the first Frenchman to win the trophy since it was first awarded in 1946.

The format of the competition was eight knock-out rounds followed by a final. The first two rounds were composed entirely of 48 amateur teams. The 12 winners of the second round ties were joined in round three by the 14 League 1 teams. For the fourth round, the 13 winners from round 3 were joined by 11 of the 12 Championship teams (Toulouse Olympique. who play in the Championship, chose not to enter the 2018 cup competition). Round five saw four Super League teams entering the competition, namely those that finished in the top four positions of the 2017 Qualifiers—Warrington Wolves, Widnes Vikings, Hull Kingston Rovers and Catalans Dragons. The remaining eight Super League teams joined in round six.

Round details

*Toulouse Olympique did not participate in the competition.

First round
The draw for the first round was made on 12 December 2017 at Media City and streamed live on the BBC Sport website. The draw was made by recently retired Hull F.C. captain, Gareth Ellis, and former Lance Todd Trophy winner, Paul Wellens. The 48 teams in the draw comprised 39 English amateur teams, the winners of the Scottish, Welsh and Irish leagues, two teams from the Universities rugby league and representative teams for the three armed services and the police.

Ties were played over the weekend of 27–28 January 2018 with the exception of one game postponed to the following weekend.

Second round
The draw for the second round was made on 31 January 2018 at Warrington's Halliwell Jones Stadium and streamed live on the BBC Sport website. The draw was made by Warrington Wolves former prop forward and Swinton Lions coach, Gary Chambers, and current Warrington forward Sitaleki Akauola. The 24 teams in the draw comprised the winners from the first round.

Ties were played on 10 February 2018. Batley Boys won their tie with a drop goal in golden point extra time, having won their first round tie in the same fashion.

Third round
The draw for the third round was made on 13 February live on the BBC Sport website. The draw was made by Super League players Alex Walmsley and Kriss Brining. Ties were played over the weekend of 24–25 February.

Fourth round
The draw was conducted by former player (and Challenge Cup winner) Rob Parker and former Scottish international Andrew Henderson.

Fifth round
The draw was made on 20 March 2018 by two Women's Super League players, Faye Gaskin of St. Helens and Gemma Walsh of Wigan Warriors.

Sixth Round
The draw for the Sixth Round was made on 25 April 2018, live on Chris Evans' Breakfast Show on BBC Radio Two, alongside Leeds Rhinos veteran forward Jamie Jones-Buchanan, and Warrington Wolves winger Josh Charnley.

Quarter-finals
The draw for the quarter-finals was made live on BBC Two directly after the conclusion of the Toronto v Warrington game.  The draw was made by former players Nathan McAvoy and Robbie Hunter-Paul.  Ties were played 31 May – 3 June with all four ties being televised either on Sky Sports or the BBC.

Semi-final
On 30 May 2018 the RFL announced that the semi-finals would be played as a double header at the University of Bolton Stadium in Bolton on Sunday 5 August 2018.  The draw was made live on BBC Two, directly after the end of the St Helens v Hull FC match. The draw was made by Sophie Rohan and Emily Burnette (the members of Belle Voci), who would sing "Abide with Me" before the final on 25 August.

Final

Teams:
Catalans: Tony Gigot, Lewis Tierney, David Mead, Brayden Williame, Fouad Yaha, Samisoni Langi, Josh Drinkwater, Mickael Simon, Michael McIlorum, Sam Moa, Benjamin Jullien, Benjamin Garcia, Remi Casty (c).
Substitutes (all used): Julian Bousquet, Jason Baitieri, Kenny Edwards, Mickael Goudemand.
Tries: Tierney, Garcia, Williame. Goals: Drinkwater (4/4)

Warrington: Stefan Ratchford, Tom Lineham, Bryson Goodwin, Toby King, Josh Charnley, Kevin Brown, Tyrone Roberts, Chris Hill (c), Daryl Clark, Mike Cooper, Harvey Livett, Jack Hughes, Ben Westwood.
Substitutes (all used): Ben Murdoch-Masila, George King, Declan Patton, Joe Philbin.
Tries: Murdoch-Masila, G King. Goals: Roberts (3/3)

Broadcasts
The primary broadcast organisation for the competition is BBC Sport. As in 2017 the BBC streamed one tie from each of the first five rounds live on the BBC Sport website with two games from the 6th, 7th and 8th rounds being broadcast live on BBC TV.

Live matches

See also
 2018 Women's Challenge Cup

Notes

References

External links

2018
2018 in English rugby league
2018 in Welsh rugby league
2018 in French rugby league
2018 in Scottish sport
2018 in Irish sport
2018 in Canadian rugby league